Autism spectrum disorders (ASDs) or autism spectrum conditions (ASCs) describe a range of conditions classified as neurodevelopmental disorders in the DSM-5, used by the American Psychiatric Association. As with many neurodivergent people and conditions, the popular image of autistic people and autism itself is often based on inaccurate media representations. Additionally, media about autism may promote pseudoscience such as vaccine denial or facilitated communication.

Since the 1970s, fictional portrayals of people with autism, Asperger syndrome, and other ASCs have become more frequent. Public perception of autism is often based on these fictional portrayals in novels, biographies, movies, and television series. These depictions of autism in media today are often made in a way that brings pity to the public and their concern of the topic, because their viewpoint is never actually shown, leaving the public without knowledge of autism and its diagnosis. Portrayals in the media of characters with atypical abilities (for example, the ability to multiply large numbers without a calculator) may be misinterpreted by viewers as accurate portrayals of all autistic people and of autism itself.  James McGrath writes that the stereotype of autistic individuals as successful in math and science, along with disliking fiction, is widely overrepresented in literature.

Fiction

Since the 1960s, characters have appeared in film, television, and print that could be qualified as "on the autism spectrum". Characters have been presented as being described as openly autistic in canon, or have been designed with one of many ASCs in mind.

Non-fiction

 Children of the Stars (2007) is a documentary about children with autism in China. The film examines hardships experienced by parents of children with autism and the lack of international resources for these families.
 Autism: The Musical (2007) is a documentary about the lives of autistic children and their families, while the children write and rehearse a stage production. The film won several awards, including two Emmy Awards. The film centers around The Miracle Project, a nonprofit organization focusing on providing a creative outlet for autistic children.
 The Horse Boy (2009) is a book and documentary (both released the same year), which follows the Isaacson family on their journey to Mongolia to help their autistic son.
 Temple Grandin (2010) is a biographical dramatization of the well-known autism advocate Temple Grandin.
 X+Y (2014) is a film whose protagonist, Nathan Ellis, is based on mathematical genius Daniel Lightwing who has Asperger syndrome.
 The Big Short (2015) is a film about the 2008 recession which focuses heavily on the hedge fund manager, Michael Burry, who is played by English actor Christian Bale in a leading role. Burry believes himself to be on the autistic spectrum with Asperger syndrome. During the course of the film, this is never revealed but rather it is strongly implied.
 Chicos de otro planeta (2013) is a documentary about young adults with Aspergers in Chile. The film is narrated by Chilean actor Grex.
 Autism in Love (2015) is an American documentary film.
 The Autistic Gardener (2015) is a Channel 4 documentary series in which a team of autistic people redesign people's gardens.
 Girls with Autism (2015) is a documentary following three girls at Limpsfield Grange, a specialized school in the United Kingdom.
 The Autistic Buddha (2017) is a non-fiction novel about an autistic individual's journey to Germany and China, and also about what he learned from the experience.
 The Autistic Brothers (2018) is a non-fiction novel written by a high-functioning autistic individual about his relationship with his low-functioning autistic brother. This book challenges several myths about autism.
 Love on the Spectrum (2019–2021) an Australian reality television show that follows people on the autism spectrum as they explore the dating world.

MMR vaccine theory

The MMR vaccine was the subject of controversy resulting from publication of a (now retracted) 1998 paper by Andrew Wakefield et al.  In 2010, Wakefield's research was found by the General Medical Council to have been "dishonest"; the research was declared fraudulent in 2011 by The BMJ.

A March 2007 article in BMC Public Health postulated that media reports on Wakefield's study had "created the misleading impression that the evidence for the link with autism was as substantial as the evidence against".  Earlier papers in Communication in Medicine and British Medical Journal concluded that media reports provided a misleading picture of the level of support for Wakefield's theory.

PRWeek noted that after Wakefield was removed from the general medical register for misconduct in May 2010, 62% of respondents to a poll regarding the MMR controversy stated they did not feel that the media conducted responsible reporting on health issues.

A New England Journal of Medicine article examining the history of antivaccinationists said that opposition to vaccines has existed since the 19th century, but "now the antivaccinationists' media of choice are typically television and the Internet, including its social media outlets, which are used to sway public opinion and distract attention from scientific evidence".

The role of the media in the sensationalization of the MMR vaccination issue was discussed by The BMJ:The original paper has received so much media attention, with such potential to damage public health, that it is hard to find a parallel in the history of medical science. Many other medical frauds have been exposed, but usually more quickly after publication and on less important health issues.

Concerns were also raised about the role of journalists reporting on scientific theories that they "are hardly in a position to question and comprehend. Neil Cameron, a historian who specializes in the history of science, writing for The Montreal Gazette labeled the controversy a "failure of journalism" that resulted in unnecessary deaths, saying that 1) The Lancet should not have published a study based on "statistically meaningless results" from only 12 cases; 2) the anti-vaccination crusade was continued by the satirical Private Eye magazine; and 3) a grapevine of worried parents and "nincompoop" celebrities fueled the widespread fears. The Gazette also reported that:There is no guarantee that debunking the original study is going to sway all parents. Medical experts are going to have to work hard to try to undo the damage inflicted by what is apparently a rogue medical researcher whose work was inadequately vetted by a top-ranked international journal.

Facilitated communication and rapid prompting 
A number of books and films exist that promote the scientifically discredited techniques of facilitated communication and rapid prompting as legitimate.

Films 
 Annie's Coming Out
 Autism Is a World
 Deej
 Wretches & Jabberers

Books 
 The Reason I Jump
 Fall Down 7 Times Get Up 8

Notable individuals

Some notable figures such as American animal handling systems designer and author Temple Grandin, American Pulitzer Prize-winning music critic and author Tim Page, and Swedish environmental activist Greta Thunberg are autistic. Thunberg, who in August 2018 started the "School strike for climate" movement, has explained how the "gift" of living with Asperger syndrome helps her "see things from outside the box" when it comes to climate change. In an interview with presenter Nick Robinson on BBC Radio 4's Today, the then-16-year-old activist said that autism helps her see things in "black and white". She went on to say:

Additionally, media speculation of contemporary figures as being on the autism spectrum has become popular in recent times. New York magazine reported some examples, which included that Time magazine suggested that Bill Gates is autistic, and that a biographer of Warren Buffett wrote that his prodigious memory and "fascination with numbers" give him "a vaguely autistic aura." The magazine also reported that on Celebrity Rehab, Dr. Drew Pinsky deemed basketball player Dennis Rodman a candidate for an Asperger's diagnosis, and the UCLA specialist consulted "seemed to concur". Nora Ephron criticized these conclusions, writing that popular speculative diagnoses suggest autism is "an epidemic, or else a wildly over-diagnosed thing that there used to be other words for." Thomas Sowell has criticized Time diagnosis of Gates, saying that the people diagnosing him have not seen him personally.

See also

 Societal and cultural aspects of autism

References

External links

Sociological and cultural aspects of autism
Mass media
MMR vaccine and autism